Huertea cubensis is a species of plant in the Tapisciaceae family. It is found in Cuba, the Dominican Republic, and Haiti.

References

Tapisciaceae
Vulnerable plants
Taxonomy articles created by Polbot